Luke Joseph Fickell (born August 18, 1973) is an American football coach and former player. He is the current head coach of the Wisconsin Badgers. Previously he was the head football coach at the University of Cincinnati, a position he has held from 2016 season to November 2022. Fickell played college football as a nose guard at Ohio State University from 1993 to 1996 and then was an assistant coach for the Buckeyes. He was interim head coach at Ohio State for the entire 2011 season.

Playing career
Fickell started his playing career at St. Francis DeSales High School, where he was a two-time first-team All-Ohio defensive tackle as well as a three-time state champion in wrestling. After redshirting for the Buckeyes in 1992, Fickell was a standout defensive player, making a school-record 50 consecutive starts at the nose guard position from 1993 to 1996. In his freshman year, he lined up next to Dan Wilkinson. Despite having a torn pectoral muscle, Fickell started the 1997 Rose Bowl, making two tackles in the Buckeyes' victory over Arizona State. After graduating from Ohio State in 1997, Fickell signed as an undrafted free agent with the New Orleans Saints of the National Football League (NFL).  After tearing his ACL, he spent the remainder of the season on the injured reserve list and was later released by the team.

Coaching career

Akron
After a brief stint in the NFL and at Ohio State as a graduate assistant in 1999, in 2000 Fickell was hired by the University of Akron as the defensive line coach.

Ohio State
After two seasons with the Zips, he returned to Ohio State in 2002 as the special teams coordinator under second-year head coach, Jim Tressel, helping guide the team to the 2002 BCS National Championship. In 2004, Fickell took over as the linebackers coach, adding the title co-defensive coordinator to his responsibilities in 2005. In 2010, he was named Assistant coach of the Year by the AFCA, joining a list of Buckeyes coaches to be recognized by the association that also includes Carroll Widdoes, Woody Hayes, Earle Bruce, and Jim Tressel.

In 2011,  Fickell was originally named to serve as interim head coach in place of Jim Tressel, who was given a five-game suspension by the NCAA due to a recruiting scandal. However, in May of that year, Tressell resigned and Fickell was given a one-year contract to serve as interim coach, only for the 2011 season.

After Ohio State posted a 6–6 regular season record, Fickell was passed up as the permanent head coach, and instead Ohio State hired Urban Meyer. Fickell guided the Buckeyes one last time in the 2012 Gator Bowl against Meyer's old team, the Florida Gators. After Meyer took the helm, Fickell returned to his old job as co-defensive coordinator (helping guide the Buckeyes to the 2014 CFP National Championship), a job in which he served until he was named head coach at Cincinnati.

Cincinnati
On December 10, 2016, Fickell was named as the 42nd head coach of the University of Cincinnati, taking the place of the resigning Tommy Tuberville.

In his first season, Fickell led the Bearcats to a 4–8 record.

2018 would be a historic turnaround of the program, finishing with an 11–2 record and a victory in the Military Bowl. Fickell was named AAC Coach of the Year for the 2018 season, which was only the third 11-win season in the University of Cincinnati history.

He led the team to another 11-win season in 2019.  The Bearcats reeled off nine straight wins after falling to Ohio State in the second game of the year.  The team won the East Division championship in the AAC for the first time, but fell two straight weeks to Memphis, in the final regular season game and in the conference championship.  For the second straight year, Cincinnati won its bowl game over an Atlantic Coast Conference team, winning the Birmingham Bowl over Boston College by a score of 38–6.

Before the start of the 2020 season Fickell agreed to a contract extension which would keep him at Cincinnati through the 2026 season. Fickell had previously received head coaching interest from other schools such as Michigan State, Florida State, West Virginia, Louisville, and Maryland.

Fickell was one of thirteen coaches named to the watchlist for the Bobby Dodd Coach of the Year Award before the 2020 season.

In 2020, Luke Fickell led the Cincinnati Bearcats to a 9–1 campaign including Cincinnati's second perfect regular season which included winning the 2020 AAC Championship Game against the Tulsa Golden Hurricane. Cincinnati was selected for the 2021 Peach Bowl against the #9 Georgia Bulldogs. Both teams went into the game down a number of key players due to injury, illness, or opt-outs, including Cincinnati's two All-Americans Sauce Gardner and James Wiggins. After leading by a score of 21–10 entering the fourth quarter, Cincinnati ultimately fell to Georgia on a 53-yard field goal with 7 seconds left in the game, by a final score of 24–21. Fickell was named AAC Coach of the Year for the second time in his career.

In 2021, Fickell again led the Bearcats to a perfect regular-season record, including non-conference wins at the Notre Dame Fighting Irish and the Indiana Hoosiers. Cincinnati then defended their American Athletic Conference Football Championship with a 35–20 victory over the Houston Cougars. With a record of 13–0 as the only undefeated team in the nation, Cincinnati was selected as the #4 seed in the College Football Playoff, making them the first program outside of a "Power 5" conference to advance. Fickell was named AAC Coach of the Year for the third time in his career, and for the second consecutively, as well as being named the winner of six other major awards including Home Depot Coach of the Year, Sporting News College Football Coach of the Year, Bobby Dodd Coach of the Year, Eddie Robinson Coach of the Year, AFCA Coach of the Year, and the Paul "Bear" Bryant Award.

Wisconsin 
In November, 2022, Wisconsin hired Fickell as its football coach replacing Paul Chryst.

Personal life
Luke Fickell and his wife, Amy (Goecke), who has a physical therapy degree from Ohio State, have six children—five sons and one daughter—including two sets of twin boys. They started dating when Amy was a sophomore at Ohio State; they were married in 2000. Fickell and his family are Catholic, which played a factor in Fickell's interest in coming to Cincinnati.

Fickell's eldest son, Landon, committed to Cincinnati as an offensive guard out of Moeller High School as part of the 2021 recruitment class.

Head coaching record

*resigned prior to bowl game

References

External links
 Cincinnati profile

1973 births
Living people
American football defensive linemen
Akron Zips football coaches
Cincinnati Bearcats football coaches
Ohio State Buckeyes football coaches
Ohio State Buckeyes football players
Wisconsin Badgers football coaches
New Orleans Saints players
Sportspeople from Columbus, Ohio
Coaches of American football from Ohio
Players of American football from Columbus, Ohio